Freitag's Pure Oil Service Station is an automobile service station styled like an English cottage and built in Monroe, Wisconsin in 1935 by the Pure Oil Company. It was added to the National Register of Historic Places in 1980.

History
Many early gas stations were rough, simple shacks along the road. The Pure Oil Company decided to defy that stereotype with its widespread brand. In the 1920s, their chief engineer Carl August Peterson designed a steep-roofed, brick-walled station in a Tudor Revival style. It had tall chimneys on each end, flower boxes and fancy ironwork, suggesting a picturesque English cottage. Pure Oil built hundreds of cottage-style stations like this across the U.S. from 1927 through the 1930s. The standard look suggested predictable quality to the passing motorist, prefiguring today's chain restaurants. The "cottage" styling allowed the station to blend in - even into residential neighborhoods.

Freitag's service station in Monroe is one of these cottage-style stations. Along with the standard office section it has a "lubridome" section, where cars were serviced. This station was built by C. W. (Slim) Freitag, a big band trombonist and pilot. He built it for his father to operate. The original cost for the building and the land was $16,000. After Pure Oil, by then owned by the Union Oil Company of California, merged with Union 76, the service station became affiliated with that brand.

References

Buildings and structures in Green County, Wisconsin
Commercial buildings completed in 1935
Retail buildings in Wisconsin
Gas stations on the National Register of Historic Places in Wisconsin
Union Oil Company of California
National Register of Historic Places in Green County, Wisconsin